Omar Sacco (born 3 February 1977) is an Italian former bobsledder. He competed in the four man event at the 2006 Winter Olympics.

References

External links
 

1977 births
Living people
Italian male bobsledders
Olympic bobsledders of Italy
Bobsledders at the 2006 Winter Olympics
People from Caserta
Sportspeople from the Province of Caserta